Andrejus Zadneprovskis (born August 31, 1974) is a retired Lithuanian modern pentathlete who won the silver medal at the 2004 Summer Olympics in Athens, Greece, as well as bronze medal at the 2008 Summer Olympics in Beijing. Zadneprovskis won the gold medal in the Modern Pentathlon World Championships in the year of 2000 and 2004. He also earned the bronze medal at the Modern Pentathlon World Championships 2006 in Guatemala. In 2010 he retired from sport due to health problems.

In 2009 he married modern pentathlete Laura Asadauskaitė, who won the gold medal at the 2012 Summer Olympics. They have daughter who was born in 2010. He also has a daughter with his ex-girlfriend.

In 2012 Zadneprovskis was elected to the UIPM executives. In 2014 Zadneprovskis became the president of the Lithuanian Padel Tennis Federation.

References

External links 
 Sports Illustrated profile
 

1974 births
Living people
People from Kaliningrad
Lithuanian people of Russian descent
Sportspeople from Vilnius
Lithuanian male modern pentathletes
Olympic modern pentathletes of Lithuania
Modern pentathletes at the 1996 Summer Olympics
Modern pentathletes at the 2000 Summer Olympics
Modern pentathletes at the 2004 Summer Olympics
Modern pentathletes at the 2008 Summer Olympics
Olympic silver medalists for Lithuania
Olympic bronze medalists for Lithuania
Olympic medalists in modern pentathlon
Medalists at the 2008 Summer Olympics
Medalists at the 2004 Summer Olympics
World Modern Pentathlon Championships medalists
Modern pentathlon coaches